Şeyma Ercan (born 5 July 1994 in Ankara, Turkey) is a Turkish volleyball player who plays for Türk Hava Yolları SK. She was encouraged by coach Elif Öz. She is a member of the Turkey women's youth national volleyball team, and wears number 5.
In 2009, at the age of only 15, she became a member of the A-team, which played in the Turkish Women's Volleyball Second League. She transferred to Beşiktaş Women's Volleyball Team in Istanbul in the 2011-2012 season. In September 2012, she signed a three-year contract with Eczacıbaşı VitrA, which then loaned her out for one year to Bursa Büyükşehir Belediyespor. She spent next two years at Eczacıbaşı VitrA.
In 2015, she transferred to Fenerbahçe Grundig Women's Volleyball Team.

Şeyma Ercan debuted in the girls' youth national team in 2011 playing at the 2011 CEV Girls Youth Volleyball European Championship, where her team won the gold medal and she was honored with the Best Server title. She won the 2012 Women's Junior European Volleyball Championship with the national team.

Clubs
  Gazi University (2009-2011)
  Beşiktaş (2011-2012)
  Bursa Büyükşehir Belediyespor (2012-2013)
  Eczacıbaşı VitrA (2013-2015)
  Fenerbahçe Grundig (2015-2017)
  Beşiktaş (2017-)

Awards

Individual
 2011 CEV Girls Youth Volleyball European Championship - Best Server

National team
 2011 CEV Girls Youth Volleyball European Championship - 
 2011 FIVB Girls Youth World Championship - 
 2012 Women's Junior European Volleyball Championship - 
 2015 FIVB Volleyball Women's U23 World Championship - 
 2018 Nations League -   Silver Medal
 2019 European Championship -  Silver Medal
 2021 Nations League -   Bronze Medal

See also
 Turkish women in sports

References

1994 births
Sportspeople from Ankara
Living people
Turkish women's volleyball players
Beşiktaş volleyballers
Eczacıbaşı volleyball players
Fenerbahçe volleyballers
Volleyball players at the 2020 Summer Olympics
Olympic volleyball players of Turkey